Hebron is a city in, and the county seat of, Thayer County, Nebraska, United States.  The population was 1,441 at the 2020 census.

History
Hebron was founded about 1869 by a colony of Disciples of Christ. It was named after the ancient city of Hebron.

Hebron native Loetta Norene Raatz, 1928-2021, was inducted into the Nebraska Hall of Fame by Governor Kay Orr in honor of her record 65 years of service with the Nebraska Department of Health & Human Services until her retirement in 2011.

The historic Hebron United States Post Office, now on the U.S. National Register of Historic Places, was built in the town in 1937 by architect Louis A. Simon.

A tornado in 1953 caused severe damage.

In 2021, the United States Department of Agriculture announced that a large well site would be constructed in a field near Hebron, a major part of a larger bid to improve water infrastructure for farmers across the state of Nebraska and neighboring Kansas.

Geography
Hebron is located at  (40.168345, -97.586574).

Climate

Demographics

2010 census
As of the census of 2010, there were 1,579 people, 698 households, and 402 families living in the city. The racial makeup of the city was 97.7% White, 0.4% African American, 0.1% Native American, 0.5% Asian, 0.3% from other races, and 0.9% from two or more races. Hispanic or Latino of any race were 1.5% of the population.

There were 698 households, of which 21.1% had children under the age of 18 living with them, 49.7% were married couples living together, 5.0% had a female householder with no husband present, 2.9% had a male householder with no wife present, and 42.4% were non-families. 39.0% of all households were made up of individuals, and 23.3% had someone living alone who was 65 years of age or older. The average household size was 2.09 and the average family size was 2.77.

The median age in the city was 51.3 years. 18.4% of residents were under the age of 18; 6.1% were between the ages of 18 and 24; 18.2% were from 25 to 44; 27.2% were from 45 to 64; and 30.1% were 65 years of age or older. The gender makeup of the city was 46.9% male and 53.1% female.

2000 census
As of the census of 2000, there were 1,565 people, 700 households, and 417 families living in the city. The population density was 1,118.5 people per square mile (431.6/km). There were 761 housing units at an average density of 543.9 per square mile (209.9/km). The racial makeup of the city was 99.36% White, 0.19% Native American, 0.06% Asian, and 0.38% from two or more races. Hispanic or Latino of any race were 0.26% of the population.

There were 700 households, out of which 25.0% had children under the age of 18 living with them, 50.6% were married couples living together, 6.7% had a female householder with no husband present, and 40.3% were non-families. 38.9% of all households were made up of individuals, and 22.1% had someone living alone who was 65 years of age or older. The average household size was 2.15 and the average family size was 2.85.

In the city, the population was spread out, with 22.6% under the age of 18, 4.4% from 18 to 24, 21.9% from 25 to 44, 25.0% from 45 to 64, and 26.1% who were 65 years of age or older. The median age was 46 years. For every 100 females, there were 95.1 males. For every 100 females age 18 and over, there were 87.5 males.

As of 2000 the median income for a household in the city was $31,000, and the median income for a family was $39,524. Males had a median income of $30,655 versus $19,009 for females. The per capita income for the city was $20,505. About 4.9% of families and 9.5% of the population were below the poverty line, including 18.6% of those under age 18 and 7.2% of those age 65 or over.

Attractions
The swing in the city park at 5th and Jefferson Streets is claimed to be the world's largest porch swing, long enough to fit 24 adults.

Notable people
Ken Darby, composer, lyricist, and conductor
H.H. Kemper, Saskatchewan politician
Greg Lee, television and stage actor
Elmo Roper, pollster

See also
 National Register of Historic Places listings in Thayer County, Nebraska

References

External links

 City of Hebron

Cities in Nebraska
Cities in Thayer County, Nebraska
County seats in Nebraska